Oxford Plains Speedway is a 3/8 mile racetrack located in Oxford, Maine. Established in 1950, the track was originally a half mile before being shortened to a 3/8 mile track. With 14,000 seats, the speedway has the largest seating capacity of any sporting venue in Maine. The main race held there is the HP Hood Oxford 250, which has run under various sanctions over the years; in the early 1990s, the race was a combination race between the NASCAR Busch Series and NASCAR Busch North Series, but it later became an American Canadian Tour Late Model race, and now a Pro All Star Series Super Late Model race. The 250 green flag lap race has often featured stars from NASCAR's three national series, even when it was not an Xfinity championship race in the early 1990s, as it is currently held during the NASCAR late-summer off week.  Among the NASCAR stars who have raced the annual Oxford 250 are 17 drivers who have won NASCAR Cup Series majors, with eleven of them Sprint Cup Series champions, and five of those are now NASCAR Hall of Fame members.

The track is well known for its wide-open turns.

The track also hosted 3 NASCAR Cup Series races between 1966 and 1968. 2 of them won by Bobby Allison and the other one won by Richard Petty.

The speedway is also known around Maine for yearly hosting several Pro All Star Series races during the season, and for its motor mayhem events that include smokey doughnut shows, spectator drags, jack and jill races, enduros, and formally had the ramp jump that has been discontinued for safety reasons. The track offers racing twice weekly during the season. The Wednesday night Oxford Acceleration Series offers five divisions including Outlaws, Rebels, Sport Trucks, Cruisers and Ladies divisions. Saturday night Oxford Championship Series divisions include the headlining Super Late Models with Street Stocks, Bandits, Figure 8's as well as regional divisions that include Legends, North East Classic Lites, the Wicked Good Vintage Racing Association and the Pro All Star Series Modifieds.

The stadium held The Monsters of Rock Festival, featuring Van Halen, Scorpions, Dokken, Metallica and Kingdom Come on June 25, 1988. A show scheduled for the previous day was cancelled.

The Grateful Dead performed, on two consecutive nights, at the racetrack on July 2–3, 1988, with Little Feat as their opening act.

In late 2012 the owner Bill Ryan sold the speedway to current owner Tom Mayberry. Since then there has been a change in the direction of the speedway, it no longer sanctions  ACT-type Late Models as a weekly division, instead turning to Tom Mayberry's PASS (Pro All Star Series) Super Late Models which now serve as the weekly headliner. The Pro All Stars Series Super Late Model and Modified tours also make several stops at Oxford Plains during the racing season.  The Oxford 250 is now a PASS Super Late Model race, with drivers across the continent who participate in Super Late Models under PASS, NASCAR, Champion Racing Association, Spears Southwest Tour, and other top Super Late Model series to use the same car they use in their home series, as most tracks with Super Late Models use a single set of rules for car specification.

In 2018, the American Canadian Tour made its return to Oxford Plains after an absence in 2017 with Eddie MacDonald sweeping both the events. ACT will return in 2019 with the Pro All Star Series and Oxford Plains season opener in May along with the Saturday night race before Oxford 250 Sunday in August. The Oxford 250 night before event will also feature Modified stock car racing from the Tri Track Modified Series.

Super Late Model Track Championship

Annual Oxford 250 Champions

External links
 Official Web Site
Oxford Plains Speedway archive at Racing-Reference

Sports venues completed in 1950
NASCAR tracks
Motorsport venues in Maine
Buildings and structures in Oxford County, Maine
Tourist attractions in Oxford County, Maine
Oxford, Maine